Elitist is an American progressive metalcore band from Los Angeles, California, United States, signed to Equal Vision Records. They recorded three EPs and two full-length albums, the final release being a self-titled album Elitist released June 29, 2015. On September 7, 2015 the band announced their breakup after members decided to pursue other creative ventures. On March 2, 2021 they announced their reunion via Twitter along with a teaser of a new song

History

Formation and Caves (2010-2011)
Elitist was founded in April 2010 by guitarist Julian Rodriguez and Jacob Katz, both former members of a previous project called Another Day In Vain. They recorded a demo titled "Principles" which led them to recruit bassist Mike Danese, drummer Robert Platz and second guitarist Sean Hall (also a member of another pre-Elitist project called The Fortune Teller). They recorded and released a five-song EP "Caves".

Earth (2011) 
In early 2011 vocalist Jacob Katz left the band and was replaced by Alex "DeHeart" (Who formed a new project called Subverse and released a song called Hero). The band signed to Blkheart Group, an independent label and management group, and recorded their second EP "Earth".

Reshape Reason (2012)
In January 2012 guitarist Sean Hall left the group to pursue a tattooist career. Shortly after Elitist completed a mini-tour with Impending Doom and Molotov Solution. The band then went on their first major tour as direct support for Scale the Summit. During the tour, drummer Robert Platz left the band to join punk rock group Drive-A. The band continued the rest of the tour with programmed drums created in the tour van by Rodriguez, as well as utilizing ERRA drummer Alex Ballew. On return, The band left Blkheart Group and parted ways with vocalist Alex in pursuit of a new vocal direction. The position was promptly filled by longtime friend of the band Chris Balay. They announced in early spring that they would release a new album entitled Reshape Reason, which was released on September 25 independently in close collaboration with The Anti Campaign.  Bassist Mike Danese stated that with this album, they wanted to combine crowd favorites such as "Caves" and "Specter" from the previous album in order to make Reshape Reason a hit with fans. Reshape Reason ranked number 4 on the iTunes metal charts its first week.

Between The Balance (2013)
In February 2013, Elitist released four studio updates that featured drum, guitar, bass and vocal tracking. Rodriguez mentioned it will be the first release to feature clean vocals from both himself and Baley. The official announcement of a new five-song EP to be released in June 2013 entitled "Between The Balance". The band also advertised Rodriguez's studio business named "Parallel Focus Studios" for production services, where the EP was co-produced.

New album (2014-2015)
Sometime in early 2014 Brian McGraw replaced bassist Mike Danese for undisclosed reasons. In February they released an acoustic version of the single "Return To Sender" from 2013 EP "Between The Balance". On April 21, 2014, the band signed to Equal Vision Records and produced their next album later that year. The band produced the record with Parallel Focus Studios. During April and May the band toured in support of Texas in July, they also announced they would be touring in support of Like Moths To Flames in August.

Members
 Julian Rodriguez - guitars (2010–2015)
 Chris Balay - lead vocals (2012–2015)
 Ben Kazenoff - drums (2012–2015)
 Brian McGraw - bass  (2014-2015) 
 Robert Platz - drums (2010–2012)
 Jacob Katz - vocals (2010–2011)
 Sean Hall - guitar (2010–2012)
 Alex "DeHeart" (stage last name) - vocals (2011–2012)
 Zack Jones - guitar (touring) (2012)
 Mike Danese - bass (2010–2014)

Additional personnel
 Gus Farias - guest vocals on "Principles"
 Michael Barr - guest vocals on "Odeon"
 Garrison Lee - guest vocals on "Life Lost"
 Diego Farias - Production on "Caves" and "Earth"
 Daniel Braunstein - Production on "Reshape Reason" and co-recording "Between The Balance"

Timeline

Music videos 
"Caves" (2010)
"Unto the Sun" (2012)
"Numbered" (2015)
"Idle Hands" (2015)

Discography

Studio albums

Demos

Extended plays

Singles

References

Metalcore musical groups from California
American progressive metal musical groups
Musical groups established in 2010
Musical groups reestablished in 2021
Musical quartets
Musical groups disestablished in 2015
2010 establishments in California
Equal Vision Records artists